Dan Watermeier (born May 29, 1961 in Lincoln, Nebraska) is an American politician and a former Nebraska state senator in the unicameral Nebraska Legislature representing District 1.

While in the legislature, Watermeier served as the chairman of the Legislative Performance Audit Committee and vice-chairman of the Executive Committee.

Education
Watermeier earned his BS in agriculture from University of Nebraska–Lincoln.

Elections
When Senator Lavon Heidemann ran for Nebraska University Board of Regents in 2012 and left the District 1 seat open, Watermeier placed first in the May 15, 2012, Primary election with 3,438 votes, and won the November 6, 2012 General election with 8,737 votes against Jerry Joy, who had previously run for the seat in 2008.

Watermeier was previously elected to the Nemaha Natural Resources District and appointed to the Nebraska Natural Resources Commission.

References

External links
 Official page at the Nebraska Legislature
 
 Biography at Ballotpedia
 Financial information (state office) at the National Institute for Money in State Politics

1961 births
21st-century American politicians
Living people
Republican Party Nebraska state senators
People from Syracuse, Nebraska
Politicians from Lincoln, Nebraska
University of Nebraska–Lincoln alumni